The State College Area School District (SCASD) is a large, suburban and rural public school district based in State College, Pennsylvania that serves students and includes public schools in the Borough of State College, Pennsylvania, and the surrounding townships of College, Ferguson, Halfmoon, Harris, and Patton. According to 2008 local census data, the district served a resident population of 86,106.
This district operates nine elementary schools, three secondary schools (two middle schools and one high school), one alternate program (middle and high school,) and four public charter schools.

Extracurriculars
The district offers an extensive extracurricular program for elementary through high school students, including: clubs, activities and sports. The district's athletics programs are under the Pennsylvania Interscholastic Athletic Association.

Sports
The District funds:

Boys
Baseball - AAAA
Basketball- AAAA
Cross Country - AAA
Football - AAAA
Golf - AAA
Indoor Track and Field - AAA
Lacrosse - AAAA
Soccer - AAA
Swimming and Diving - AAA
Tennis - AAA
Track and Field - AAA
Volleyball - AAA
Wrestling - AAA

Girls
Basketball - AAAA
Cheer - AAAA
Cross Country - AAA
Indoor Track and Field - AAAA
Field Hockey - AAA
Golf - AAA
Lacrosse - AAAA
Rugby - AAAA
Soccer (Fall) - AAA
Softball - AAAA
Swimming and Diving - AAA
Girls' Tennis - AAA
Track and Field - AAA
Volleyball - AAA

Middle School Sports

Boys
Basketball
Football
Soccer
Track and Field
Wrestling	

Girls
Basketball
Cheer
Field Hockey
Soccer
Softball 
Track and Field
Volleyball

According to the 2018-2019 SCASD Middle School Student Handbook

See also 
 Saxe v. State College Area School District

References

External links

High School Facilities Project
State High Vision
The Sensible Solution
Vote for Change
Friends of Lemont School
Centre Daily Times article--"History, Craftsmanship Make Lemont School Worth Saving

School districts in Centre County, Pennsylvania
State College, Pennsylvania